This is a List of hospitals in Botswana.  There are 624 medical facilities in Botswana, including 26 public hospitals. Botswana had an estimated population of 2,352,000 in 2020. The first tier of public hospitals are located in rural areas that each serve a maximum of 10,000 people. Each hospital has between 20 and 70 beds. The second tier of public hospitals is made up of seven district hospitals located in larger villages and cities. They have between 71 and 250 beds. The third tier of public hospitals has three referral based hospitals that are specialized.

South-East District

Hospitals and clinics are located in three cities in the South-East District include:

Gaborone
 Avenue Medical Center
 Capital Medical Center
 Gaborone Children Care Clinic
 Life Gaborone Private Hospital
 Independence Surgery Molefi Close
 Karong Clinics
 LenMed Health Bokamoso Private Hospital
 Medical Center (Gaborone, Botswana)
 The Medical Clinic
 Middlestar Clinic
Princess Marina Hospital
Sidilega Private Hospital
Sir Ketumile Masire Teaching Hospital

Lobatse
Athlone District Hospital
Sbrana Psychiatric Hospital
Supra Sight Hospital

Ramotswa
 Bamalete Lutheran Hospital

North-East District
Hospitals in the North-East District include:

 Riverside Hospital, Francistown
 Francistown Academic Hospital, Francistown
Nyangabgwe Referral Hospital, Francistown
Gweta Primary Hospital, Gweta
Masunga Primary Hospital, Masunga
Tutume Primary Hospital, Tutume

Central District 
The following hospitals are in the Central District:

Bobonong Primary Hospital, Bobonong
Lelhakane Primary Hospital, Letlhakane
Mahalapye District Hospital, Mahalapye
Mmadinare Primary Hospital, Mmadinare
 Orapa Hospital, Orapa
Palapye Primary Hospital, Palapye
Rakops Primary Hospital, Rakops
Sefhare Primary Hospital, Sefhare
Selibe Phikwe Government Hospital, Selibe Phikwe
Sekgoma Memorial Hospital, Serowe

Ngamiland (North-West District)
Hospitals in the North-West District (also called Ngamiland) include:

Doctors Inn, Maun
Letsholathebe II Memorial Hospital, Maun
Maun General Hospital, Maun
Maun Private Hospital
Prime Health Medical Center
Gumare Primary Hospital, Gumare

Southern  District
There are three hospitals in the Southern District:

Good Hope Primary Hospital, Good Hope, Botswana
 Debswana Jwaneng Mine Hospita, Jwanengl
 Kanye Seventh-day Adventist Hospital, Kanye

South-East District
There is one hospital in the South-East District:
Bamalete Lutheran Hospital, Ramotswa

Chobe and Ghanzi Districts
The following hospitals are in the Chobe District and Ghanzi District.
Kasane Primary Hospital, Chobe District
Gantsi Primary Hospital, Ghanzi District

Kgatleng District 
There is one hospital in the Kgatleng District:
Deborah Retief Memorial Hospital, Mochudi

Kgalagadi District 
There are two hospitals in the Kgalagadi District:
 Hukuntsi Primary Hospital
 Tsabong Primary Hospital

Kweneng District 

There are two hospitals in the Kweneng District:
Scottish Livingstone Hospital, Molepolole
Thamaga Primary Hospital, Thamaga

See also
 Districts of Botswana
 Health in Botswana

References 

 
Botswana
Botswana
Hospitals